Homay, also rendered as Umay or Umai or Homa, in Iran may refer to:
 Homay-e Olya
 Homay-e Sofla
 Homag (disambiguation)
 Umay, alternate name of Mazraeh-ye Savareh